The Reading Open was a golf tournament on the PGA Tour that was played in Reading, Pennsylvania in the late 1940s and early 1950s. It was played at three different locations.

Tournament hosts

Winners

References

Former PGA Tour events
Golf in Pennsylvania
Sports in Reading, Pennsylvania
Recurring sporting events established in 1947
Recurring sporting events disestablished in 1951
1947 establishments in Pennsylvania
1951 disestablishments in Pennsylvania